is a historic place in the town and municipality of Dorado, in Puerto Rico.

It is the agriculture, architecture and industry surrounding this hacienda that makes it an important part of Puerto Rican history and culture.

The privately owned property has had many owners over the years, including Don José Nevares. Oscar Nevares, the uncle of Ricardo Rosselló, the governor of Puerto Rico, has a house there. The hacienda is now being used as a dairy farm with over 350 cows and is located next to the Plata River, where cows from the farm can be seen from Puerto Rico Highway 693 and Puerto Rico Highway 2.

It was listed on the U.S. National Register of Historic Places on March 22, 1989.

Still standing, is a historic smoke stack from 1861, a chimney which was used when the hacienda was a sugarcane mill.

Gallery

See also

 National Register of Historic Places listings in Puerto Rico

References

External links
 

Buildings and structures on the National Register of Historic Places in Puerto Rico
Industrial buildings completed in 1849
Chimneys
Sugar industry in Puerto Rico
National Register of Historic Places in Dorado, Puerto Rico
Farms on the National Register of Historic Places
Industrial buildings and structures on the National Register of Historic Places in Puerto Rico
Sugar plantations in the Caribbean
Vassallo
Dairy farming